The name Cempaka has been used to name two tropical cyclones worldwide: one in the Australian region and one in the western north Pacific Ocean. In the Western Pacific, the name was submitted by Malaysia and refers to the Magnolia champaca flower.

In the Australian region:
Cyclone Cempaka (2017) – a weak system that caused flooding and landslides in Indonesia.

In the Western Pacific:
Typhoon Cempaka (2021) (T2107, 10W) – a fairly long-lived cyclone that caused substantial damage in China and Vietnam.

Pacific typhoon set index articles
Australian region cyclone set index articles